Knaggs is an English surname, whose bearers include:

Charlie Knaggs, Colonel in the Irish Guards
Henry Valentine Knaggs (1859–1954), physician and author
James Knaggs, territorial commander, Western USA Salvation Army
Sir Samuel William Knaggs (1856–1924), civil servant (West Indies)
Skelton Knaggs (1911–1955), stage actor and horror movie actor
Thomas Knaggs (1661–1724), preacher and publisher of sermons
Whitmore Knaggs (1763–1827), US fighter, linguist and spy

References

English-language surnames